The 2018 Foxwoods Resort Casino 301 is a Monster Energy NASCAR Cup Series race held on July 22, 2018 at New Hampshire Motor Speedway in Loudon, New Hampshire. Contested over 301 laps on the  speedway, it was the 20th race of the 2018 Monster Energy NASCAR Cup Series season.

Report

Background

New Hampshire Motor Speedway is a  oval speedway located in Loudon, New Hampshire, which has hosted NASCAR racing annually since the early 1990s, as well as the longest-running motorcycle race in North America, the Loudon Classic. Nicknamed "The Magic Mile", the speedway is often converted into a  road course, which includes much of the oval.

The track was originally the site of Bryar Motorsports Park before being purchased and redeveloped by Bob Bahre. The track is currently one of eight major NASCAR tracks owned and operated by Speedway Motorsports.

Entry list

First practice

Qualifying

Qualifying results

Practice (post-qualifying)

Second practice

Final practice

Race

Stage Results

Stage 1
Laps: 75

Stage 2
Laps: 75

Final Stage Results

Stage 3
Laps: 151

Race statistics
 Lead changes: 7 among different drivers
 Cautions/Laps: 7 for 31
 Red flags: 0
 Time of race: 2 hours, 52 minutes and 56 seconds
 Average speed:

Media

Television
NBC Sports covered the race on the television side. Steve Letarte, four-time and all-time Loudon winner Jeff Burton and Dale Earnhardt Jr. had the call in the booth for the race as part of an NBC Special Analyst Broadcast. Rick Allen, Parker Kligerman, Marty Snider and Kelli Stavast reported from pit lane during the race.

Radio
PRN had the radio call for the race, which was simulcast on Sirius XM NASCAR Radio.

Standings after the race

Drivers' Championship standings

Manufacturers' Championship standings

Note: Only the first 16 positions are included for the driver standings.
. – Driver has clinched a position in the Monster Energy NASCAR Cup Series playoffs.

References

2018 Foxwoods Resort Casino 301
2018 Monster Energy NASCAR Cup Series
2018 in sports in New Hampshire
July 2018 sports events in the United States